Out of Control is a 2017 German-Chinese action thriller film directed by  and Richard Lin and starring Choi Seung-hyun and Cecilia Cheung.

Plot

Cast
 Cecilia Cheung as Lucy Lin
 T.O.P as Tom Young
 Michael Trevino as Bennet Kayser
 Steve Windolf as Francoise Lazard
 Angelina Fei as Tang Su
 Joseph Zeng as Bobby Fang
 Götz Burger as Chauffeur Schmidt
 Marko Dyrlich as Roland Bail
 David Cheung as Charlie
 Martin Umbach as Chief Karsten Bergmann

Production
The film was produced by Dreams of Dragons Pictures (China) and Action Concept (Germany). Principal photography took place in Germany from February to May 2016.

Release
The film premiered at Film Festival Cologne on 1 October 2017 in Cologne, Germany.

References

External links
 
 Production company

Chinese action thriller films
German action thriller films
Huaxia Film Distribution films
Films shot in Germany
Films set in Germany
2017 action thriller films
2010s German films